Panjo 5 was an Australian dance and pop music quintet. The band was formed following a reality television talent show called Airtime!, which was broadcast on Nickelodeon and the Nine Network.

Their second song, "Stay Closer" received airtime on the Today Network and peaked at number 33 on the Australian Top 100 Physical Singles Chart. The release of "Stay Closer" followed the release of the band's debut song "Move" on 1 November 2008.

They officially announced their break-up on 19 November 2009 on their Facebook and Myspace page, with no third single released.

One year after the release of "Stay Closer", former member Elen Menaker altered her stage name to Elen Levon. She released her debut single "Naughty" (Nufirm/Ministry of Sound) on 30 September 2011, and featured Australian artist and producer Israel Cruz.

Discography

Singles

Notes

References

External links
 Official website

Australian pop music groups